Aequorivita viscosa  is a Gram-negative, short rod-shaped, aerobic and non-spore-forming bacterium from the genus of Aequorivita which has been isolated from seaweed from the intertidal zone from the East China Sea near Zhoushan in China.

References

External links
Type strain of Aequorivita viscosa at BacDive -  the Bacterial Diversity Metadatabase

Flavobacteria
Bacteria described in 2013